Rookwood could refer to:

Places:
Rookwood, New South Wales, a suburb of Sydney, Australia
Rookwood Cemetery in Sydney, Australia
Rookwood, Queensland, a locality in the Shire of Mareeba, Australia

People:
Ambrose Rookwood, part of the Gunpowder Plot of 1605

Fictional characters:
Augustus Rookwood, a minor Death Eater character in the Harry Potter novels
 Rookwood, a minor character V impersonates in V for Vendetta

Other:
Rookwood Pottery Company, a pottery manufacturer based in Cincinnati, Ohio
Rookwood (novel), a novel by William Harrison Ainsworth published in 1834